Shannon Cave is an active stream passage cave which straddles the border of County Fermanagh, Northern Ireland and County Cavan in the Republic of Ireland.

At  vertical depth, it stands joint sixth with Poulnagree in County Clare in the deepest caves on the island of Ireland.

Description 
The cave consists in the main of a large mainstream passage running to a terminal sump. The water flowing in the cave has been dye traced to Shannon Pot, two kilometres to the west of the terminal sump, which is the traditional source of the River Shannon. Inlets to the main passage are numerous. Some, such as the large "Mistake Passage" have been pushed only a short distance. Since the cave is undergoing active exploration, there remain many issues to be sorted out and the sinks for many of these inlets remains unclear. The stream passage itself is of considerable proportions in parts, but also contains many higher level fossil passages which have been deserted by the stream. The cave contains numerous calcite formations, with large amounts of helictites in places. Boulder chokes are frequent with several parts of the cave being quite unstable, especially the JCP passage.

Location 
While the location of the entrance to the cave is in County Fermanagh, the majority of the cave lies under County Cavan. The original entrance to the cave was in Cavan; however, this is now inaccessible. The current entrance of Polltullyard is located north of the Marlbank area of Fermanagh, high in the moors.

Exploration history

1980s: Discovery and initial exploration 
The cave was discovered in August 1980 by members of the Reyfad Group, the cavers' collective responsible for exploring the Reyfad system. The entrance was made in a shakehole adjacent to the sink point of the Hune (pronounced "honey") stream, and close the border in County Cavan. This entrance became known as "Pollahune". The initial route was dug through a highly unstable area of glacial fill, making it extremely treacherous. Once in the cave the cavers encountered a "main" streamway into which the Hune flowed, with the upstream section leading to "JCP Passage" and the downstream section passing another significant inlet, "Mistake Passage".

Downstream, the team reached a terminus at a prominent boulder choke, through which they attempted to dig. In October 1980 a section of the choke collapsed on Rev. George Pitt while he attempted to force a passage at river level. He became trapped for 10 hours, but was freed after a major rescue effort. By 1990 the explorers had passed the newly named George's Choke.

While discoveries were being made in Shannon Cave in 1980, attention was also being paid to a large doline less than a kilometre away in County Fermanagh. Members of the Reyfad Group (including the aforementioned Rev. Pitt) and the Irish Caving Club worked together to dig their way into passage leading to a  underground shaft, with boulder chokes and crawls at its base. They named this cave Co-operation Pot in honour of their collaboration, but later the name Polltullyard, after the local townland, was adopted.

1990s–2000s: Pollahune collapse and new entrance 
The Pollahune entrance to Shannon was always dangerous, often dumping rocks on passing cavers and finally in 1995 it collapsed, making the cave inaccessible. During subsequent years attention was turned to Polltullyard, the downstream end of which lay within  of upstream JCP Passage, according to the surveys. Various groups of cavers attempted to dig through the terminal boulder choke, but none were successful in stabilising the passage. In 2004 cavers from the Shannon Group began in earnest to attempt to re-enter the system, and initiated a new dig in the direction of Shannon Cave. By 2005 Shannon Cave had been re-entered via a very tight section of passage named the "Rebirth Canal". The cavers had regained JCP Passage, and access to the rest of the cave as far as George's Choke, which had collapsed again as reported by cavers on the last trip into Shannon Cave. In 2007, after two years' work digging and stabilising, George's Choke was passed. The explorers reached the terminal sump, the first people to do so in twelve years.

2008: Saint Patrick's Extension 
A new dig began on a balcony above the terminal sump, attempting to push a route through the boulder choke, but progress was slow and the choke proved unstable. In early 2008 a team of British cave divers were invited over to dive the sump, now named "Young, Free and Desperate". After  the divers emerged at the far side of the choke and made a voice connection with the dry cavers on the other side. After exploring downstream for one kilometre they returned to help dig from the other side of the choke. A connection was made a week later, after a further dive.  of cave was surveyed beyond the choke. The extension eventually terminated at a new terminal sump. The new section was named "St. Patrick's Extension", and the canyon passage named "Paddy's Parade". The sump, number 5 in the system, was named "Long Way From Home".

"Downstream of sump 4 the streamway comprises c. 450 m of fine canyon passage. ... [It] is perhaps one of the grandest sections of canyon passage in Ireland but on a striking scale. The passage is about 1–2 metres wide and ranges from 8 to 14 metres in height. There is also evidence of old high-level passage with a few rift/high level passage leads."

2009: Easter Extension 
Methodical exploration of high-level leads in St. Patrick's Extension in 2009 led to the discovery of a tight cross-rift intercepting a section of "Paddy's Parade" at right-angles. The last of these pitches was found to take a small stream, which was followed at the base of the pitch to a sump. Although it has not been traced, it is likely that this stream joins the main Shannon Cave watercourse further downstream of the Snake Escape. 

Upstream, beyond the pitches, a further  of active stream passage was followed upstream to a sump.

References

Further  reading

External links 
 Shannon Group caving club
 Log of digging and exploration – Queen's University Belfast Caving Club
 Description of Polltullyard – Northern Ireland Environment Agency
 Surveying trip report – Clare Caving Club

Caves of Northern Ireland
Limestone caves
Landforms of County Fermanagh
Landforms of County Cavan
Caves of the Republic of Ireland
Protected areas of County Cavan
Protected areas of County Fermanagh
River Shannon